is a Japanese voice actress and musician. She is known for her roles as Jiyuu Nanohana in Jubei-chan, Sae Sawanoguchi in Magic User's Club, Nene Romanova in Bubblegum Crisis Tokyo 2040, and the title character Ojarumaru. In video games she voiced Shiori Misaka in the original Kanon visual novel, Lilith Aensland in Darkstalkers, and Bridget in Guilty Gear X2.

Life and career

She released NOVELETTE (EMI Music Japan, 1999), her first album under her own identity. She teamed up with Ryo Arshe (Ryo Asakawa), her musical collaborator since 1998 and the artist NAOMI, forming the musical unit Little Cure.

As a TV personality, she has appeared on both NHK and public sector network shows. She had been a regular on the TV Tokyo-syndicated variety show Ichioshi Kiss, where she was portrayed as the youngest of three sisters, with co-stars  and Hinako Saeki. She was also narrator for the short-lived "pick of the week" show . She also acted in live action TV Commercials for "Dial 104" (cellphone directory assistance), as keitai detective PI Hiroko.

In 2018, Konishi claimed that she was replaced as Ojarumaru in Prince Mackaroo from disputes over her voice recording on Ojarumaru dolls and other merchandise. Motivated by the Me Too movement, Konishi shared that she left voice acting after being sexually harassed and witnessing her other female peers abused by their agencies. She also alleged that she was propositioned by her manager Hara to enter a mixed bath in the nude with Akitaro Daichi and claimed that she was unable to get voice acting work after she refused.

Filmography

Anime

Film

Video games

Audio dramas

Discography 
Albums
   (King Records, 1998, KICA-7900)
 Novelete (EMI Music Japan, 1999, TYCY-10025)
 1975 (Wolfgang Label Japan, 2021, DSQI-20815

Singles
Pudding de Ojyaru (Nippon Crown Co. Ltd. 1999, as a role of Ojyaru-maru)
  (King Records, 1998, KIDA-7642)
Don’t Love (EMI Music Japan, 1999)
Bite of Love (Nippon Columbia July 2000, as a member of LITTLE CURE)
 "Sayonara Arigato" (Squirrel, 2014)
 "But She Was in Love" (Squirrel, 2014)
 "An Amulet in His Pocket" (Squirrel, 2015)
 "You Always Stay By Me" (Squirrel, 2015)

References

External links 
  
 Hiroko Konishi in Game Plaza Haruka Voice Artist Database 
 
 
 
 Hiroko Konishi at Oricon 

1975 births
Living people
Chuo University alumni
Japanese women pop singers
Japanese women singer-songwriters
Japanese video game actresses
Japanese voice actresses
Musicians from Saitama Prefecture
Voice actresses from Saitama Prefecture
20th-century Japanese actresses
20th-century Japanese women singers
20th-century Japanese singers
21st-century Japanese actresses
21st-century Japanese women singers
21st-century Japanese singers